Thomas McBride is a footballer from Derry, Northern Ireland who plays for NIFL Championship club Institute.

He previously played with Derry City, had 2 stints at Finn Harps and was a youth player for Northampton Town. McBride was also selected for the Northern Ireland Under-18 Schoolboys in 2010. However, he went on to represent the Republic of Ireland at under 19 level.

Playing career

Northampton
McBride was scouted and signed as a youth to Northampton Town F.C. but after a short spell at the club with no first team appearances, he left by mutual consent, and returned to Northern Ireland.

Derry City
McBride signed for local team Derry City on trial in 2010 and after several friendlies was signed up on a one-year contract. He regularly featured on the subs bench at the start of the new First Division season but soon won a place in the starting team. He also won Northern Irish u18 player of the year after netting 3 goals within 3 appearances. Following Derry's promotion to the Premier Division and the addition of Ruaidhri Higgins to the midfield McBride lost his place in the team and was dropped to the bench. It was announced in August 2011 that he had left the club after requesting that his contract be terminated as to complete a move to Institute.

Institute
Immediately after leaving Derry he signed for neighbouring club Institute. He left the club after his contract expired in order to sign for League of Ireland side Finn Harps.

Finn Harps
He signed for Finn Harps in February 2012. He left in May 2013, again by mutual consent.

Return to Institute
He rejoined the Drumahoe club in June 2014, for the start of his second stint with them, also marking his return to senior football (in the NIFL Premiership).
His debut was a 2–2 away draw with Dungannon Swifts on the first day of the 2014-15 NIFL Premiership season. His first competitive goal since rejoining the club came in late August, in a 2–0 home league cup win over Dollingstown. His only league goal of the season came in a 1–1 draw with Glentoran at the Riverside Stadium.

Return to Finn Harps

In the summer of 2017, McBride returned to Finn Harps as the club looked to remain in the League of Ireland Premier Division, following the departure of Barry Molloy. Despite becoming a mainstay in the side, Harps were relegated, finishing 11th place in the table.

McBride subsequently agreed a new one-year contract for the 2018 First Division season.

Third stint at Institute
McBride signed for Institute for his third spell with the club in January 2019.

Newbuildings United
In October 2019,McBride left Institute for intermediate club Newbuildings United.

Fourth stint at Institute

On 13 August 2022, he returned to Institute, marking the beginning of his fourth spell at the club.

References

1992 births
Derry City F.C. players
Northampton Town F.C. players
Institute F.C. players
Finn Harps F.C. players
Living people
League of Ireland players
NIFL Premiership players
Republic of Ireland association footballers
Sportspeople from Derry (city)
A Championship players
Association football midfielders